Stuart Musialik (born 29 March 1985 in Newcastle, Australia) is an Australian professional footballer.

Club career
Born and raised in Newcastle, he played junior football for Adamstown Rosebuds and was selected to play in representative sides such as Northern NSW at a young age. In 2004, he played for the Weston Workers Bears which under the care of Trevor Morris, awarded him a Newcastle Jets spot. The Weston Bears won the Premiership and then made it to the NBN State Football League Grand Final that they lost to Broadmeadow Magic. During his time at the Weston Workers Bears he played alongside Nigel Boogaard.

Newcastle Jets
Musialik played for the Newcastle Jets FC for the A-League's first three seasons. Musialik was suspended for 1 game on 27 September 2007 after verbally abusing Melbourne Victory FC defender Rodrigo Vargas, during a match against Melbourne on 21 September 2007, that ended in a 2–2 draw.

Sydney FC
Musialik followed his close friend Mark Bridge from the Newcastle Jets to Sydney FC to play under John Kosmina from 2008 to 2009. He signed a 2-year deal. Despite Sydney offering a contract extension, Musialik declined the offer demanding a pay rise and left Sydney at the end of the 2010/11 season. Despite being given a short extension for Sydney's 2011 Champions League campaign, Musialik was released, along with several other players.

Central Coast Mariners
On 25 July 2011, Musialik signed a one-year contract with Central Coast Mariners.

Career statistics

1Includes A-League Pre-Season Challenge Cup

International career
He was on the Australian roster for the 2005 FIFA World Youth Championship, and has since played for the Olyroos against Chinese Taipei, in Adelaide at Hindmarsh Stadium.  Stuart was one of Australia's best players in their 2008 Olympic campaign and gained many plaudits following his performances in Beijing.

Honours

With Sydney FC:
 A-League Premiership: 2009-2010
 A-League Championship: 2009-2010
With Newcastle Jets FC:
 A-League Championship: 2007-2008
With Central Coast Mariners:
 A-League Premiership: 2011-2012
Personal honours:
 Newcastle Jets FC Coach's Award: 2006-2007

References

External links
 Central Coast Mariners FC profile
 FFA - Olyroo profile

1985 births
Living people
Australian people of Polish descent
Australian soccer players
Newcastle Jets FC players
A-League Men players
Central Coast Mariners FC players
Sydney FC players
Footballers at the 2008 Summer Olympics
Olympic soccer players of Australia
National Soccer League (Australia) players
Sportspeople from Newcastle, New South Wales
Association football midfielders
Newcastle Breakers FC players